The Best of the Waitresses is a compilation album by the Waitresses, released by Polydor Records in 1990.

Track listing
Tracks are in chronological order, source listed only on first from each release.

References 

The Waitresses compilation albums
Albums produced by Hugh Padgham
1990 greatest hits albums
Polydor Records compilation albums